J. Patrick Doyle (born June 4, 1963, in Midland, Michigan) is an American businessman who was the CEO of Domino's Pizza from March 2010 to June 2018.

Career 

Before joining Domino's Pizza, Doyle was an executive with the Gerber Products Company (1991–1997). Prior to that, he was an executive with Intervascular and the erstwhile First Chicago Bank.

In 2019, joined The Carlyle Group as an executive partner.

Doyle has served on various boards of directors, including those for Best Buy, G&K Services, and Alsea.

Education 

He holds an MBA from the University of Chicago and an economics degree from the University of Michigan. He is also a member of the Sigma Phi Society.

References

American chief executives of food industry companies
University of Michigan College of Literature, Science, and the Arts alumni
Living people
1963 births
University of Chicago Booth School of Business alumni
Domino's Pizza